Give is a small railway town, with a population of 4,550 (1 January 2022), in Denmark near Vejle. As a result of "The Municipal Reform" of  2007 Give Municipality was forced to join Vejle Municipality by the Løkke government.

Give has a historical museum about the surrounding area and life in Denmark in general. The railway town is served by Give railway station which used to be the last stop going west from Vejle. Later the rails would be continued to the west.

Notable people 
 Bjarne Tromborg (born 1940 in Give) a Danish physicist, best known for his work in particle physics and photonics
 Torben Chris (born 1977 in Give) a Danish standup comedian
 Marc Pedersen (born 1989 in Give) a Danish professional football player, with over 150 club caps.

References

Cities and towns in the Region of Southern Denmark
Vejle Municipality